The Waterboy is a 1998 American sports comedy film directed by Frank Coraci. It was written by Adam Sandler as well as Tim Herlihy and produced by Robert Simonds and Jack Giarraputo. Sandler also stars as the title character while Kathy Bates, Fairuza Balk, Henry Winkler, Jerry Reed, Larry Gilliard, Jr., Blake Clark, Peter Dante, and Jonathan Loughran play other characters.

Lynn Swann, Lawrence Taylor, Jimmy Johnson, Bill Cowher, Paul "The Big Show" Wight, and Rob Schneider have cameo appearances. The film was extremely profitable, earning $39.4 million in its opening weekend alone in the United States, earning a total of $186 million worldwide.

Plot 
Robert "Bobby" Boucher Jr. is a socially inept, stuttering, and somewhat mentally challenged 31-year-old man serving as the water boy for the University of Louisiana football program. He lives with his protective and extremely religious mother, Helen, and believes his father, Robert Sr., died of dehydration in the Sahara while serving in the Peace Corps back in the 1960s.

As the players constantly bully Bobby, the Cougars' head coach, Red Beaulieu, fires him for being "disruptive" during the 18 years of his employment. Bobby approaches Coach Klein of the South-Central Louisiana State University Mud Dogs and is hired as the team's water boy.

The Mud Dogs have lost 40 consecutive games, their cheerleaders are alcoholics, and players are forced to share equipment due to budget cuts. When the new team teases him, Klein encourages Bobby to stand up for himself. Remembering all the bullying he has put up with over the years, Bobby tackles the team's quarterback, knocking him out. Seeing Bobby's potential, Klein meets with Helen and tries to persuade her to let Bobby play on the team, but she refuses, saying it is too dangerous.

Klein convinces Bobby to play anyway, seeing that Bobby is eager to attend college. Bobby becomes a feared outside linebacker and the Mud Dogs go on a winning streak. Bobby's newfound fame and confidence also allow him to reconnect with his felonious childhood love interest, Vicki Vallencourt. Helen forbids Bobby from seeing her, insisting that she "is the devil".

The team's success earns it a trip to the annual Bourbon Bowl on New Year's Day to face the Cougars and Coach Beaulieu. However, Beaulieu and his team crash the Mud Dogs' pep rally and reveal that the high school Bobby went to does not exist and that he was homeschooled, and his fake high school transcript makes him ineligible for college and football. The team and fans turn against Bobby, believing him to be a liar and cheater.

Klein convinces the National Collegiate Athletic Association (NCAA) to let Bobby play if he can pass a General Educational Development (GED) exam. He apologizes to Bobby and admits to submitting the fake transcript because he was desperate to get even with Beaulieu. Twenty years ago, Klein and Beaulieu were assistant coaches at the University of Louisiana. After Beaulieu stole and took credit for Klein's playbook, he was promoted, and Klein was fired. Klein suffered a mental breakdown and became unable to come up with new plays. The story convinces Bobby to help Klein get revenge on Beaulieu and prove himself to everyone. Bobby finally stands up to Helen while studying for the GED, angrily revealing that he has been playing football, going to college, and seeing Vicki, and intends to continue doing so.

Bobby passes the exam, but Helen feigns a coma. Feeling he drove his mother to illness, Bobby stays in the hospital with her. Meanwhile, Vicki leads a gathering of fans to the hospital to convince him to play. Seeing her son struggling to ignore this, Helen ends her fake illness. She tells Bobby the truth about Robert Sr., who abandoned her while she was four months pregnant with Bobby to have an affair with a voodoo priestess in New Orleans. This led to Helen constantly fearing that Bobby would leave her too. Deciding to put her son's happiness ahead of her own selfishness, she encourages him to play in the Bourbon Bowl.

Arriving at halftime, Bobby finds the Mud Dogs losing by a score of 27–0. Using the same technique of "visualizing and attacking" as Klein taught him, Bobby then turns the lesson back on him. Klein overcomes his fear of Beaulieu and comes up with new plays. The Mud Dogs catch up, unsettling Beaulieu, who resorts to underhanded tactics to interfere. The Mud Dogs win the Bourbon Bowl 30–27, and Bobby is named the game's Most Valuable Player (MVP), devastating Beaulieu and the Cougars.

Sometime later, Bobby and Vicki get married. Robert Sr., who has since adopted the nickname "Roberto", makes a surprise appearance to convince Bobby to skip school and go to the National Football League (NFL) so he can share in his son's newfound fame. Helen angrily tackles him to the ground, prompting cheers from the attendants. Bobby and Vicki leave on his lawn mower to consummate their marriage.

Cast

Production
The idea for The Waterboy came from one of Sandler's Saturday Night Live characters. Sandler said "You could compare him to 'Canteen Boy,' whereas he does love water and they both get picked on a lot, but the thing I like the most about this character is just that he is a genuine, good person."

Writer Tim Herlihy said the story was intended to invert the formula of his previous films, where Sandler was an extreme character surrounded by regular people. "With Happy Gilmore, [...] it was a very straight world that he was the disruptive element in. The pressure was all on Adam to be funny as Happy. Whereas this was like a funhouse, crazy version of Southern college football milieu. And it was the first movie where things were funny when Adam wasn't on screen. The pressure wasn't even on him."

Herlihy could not believe their luck getting Kathy Bates to play Boucher's mother. Bates' agent did not want her to do the film, and Bates threw the script in the trash after reading some pages, not being interested in football. Her niece spotted the script and noticed Sandler's name, and convinced her to reconsider.

Filming

Despite taking place in Louisiana, The Waterboy was mostly filmed in Central Florida and the Orlando area, as well as Daytona Beach, DeLand, and Lakeland.

The Mud Dogs home games were filmed at Spec Martin Stadium in DeLand, home of the local high school’s football team. The classrooms and gym where Bobby takes the GED are part of Stetson University, also located in DeLand. Stetson's Carlton Student Union building is featured in the scene where Bobby is told his mother has been hospitalized.

The scenes involving mama's cabin were shot on Lake Louisa in Clermont.

Coach Klein's office was a stage built inside of the Florida Army National Guard Armory in DeLand. It is home of Btry B 1st Bn 265th ADA. In the background of the practice field scenes, the Armory and some military vehicles can be seen.

The initial exterior shot of the University of Louisiana stadium was TIAA Bank Field in Jacksonville; the interior of the stadium is actually the Camping World Stadium in Orlando. The Camping World Stadium was also the filming location for the climactic Bourbon Bowl game, while the flyover shot at the beginning of the game is of Williams-Brice Stadium at the University of South Carolina in Columbia, South Carolina.

The "medulla oblongata" lecture scene was filmed at Florida Southern College in Lakeland. The extras in the scene were students at the college, and the scene was shot on campus in Edge Hall.

Soundtrack

The soundtrack for The Waterboy was released on November 3, 1998 by Hollywood Records.

Reception

Critical response
As of July 2022, review aggregator website Rotten Tomatoes reported the film had an approval rating of 33% based on 75 reviews with an average rating of 4.50/10. The site's critical consensus reads: "This is an insult to its genre with low humor and cheap gags." On Metacritic, the film has a score of 41% based on reviews from 21 critics, indicating "mixed or average reviews". Audiences surveyed by CinemaScore gave the film a grade "A−" on scale of A to F.

Roger Ebert of the Chicago Sun-Times gave the film a negative review, saying "Sandler is making a tactical error when he creates a character whose manner and voice has the effect of fingernails on a blackboard, and then expects us to hang in there for a whole movie." He also included the film on his most hated list. Lisa Alspector of the Chicago Reader also gave the film a negative review, writing "Geek triumphs after all comedies can be charming, but in this one the triumphing begins so early it's hard to feel for the geek."

Manohla Dargis of LA Weekly gave the film a mixed review, writing: "Of course it's dumb, but every 10 minutes or so, it's also pretty funny." Glen Lovell of Variety wrote of the film, "This yahoos on the bayou farce is neither inventive nor outrageous enough." David Nusair of Reel Film Reviews also gave the film a mixed review, calling it "an agreeable yet forgettable comedy."

Janet Maslin of The New York Times wrote the film was "so cheerfully outlandish that it's hard to resist, and so good hearted that it's genuinely endearing." Mark Savlov of The Austin Chronicle also gave the film a positive review, writing that it was "A mildly amusing bayou farce with plenty of 'foosball' action to liven the sometimes plodding proceedings."

Box office
The Waterboy grossed $161,491,646 in the United States, and a further $28,700,000 internationally, for a worldwide total of $190,191,646 worldwide, against an estimated production budget of $20 million. The film opened at number 1 at the US box office, earning $39,414,071 in its opening weekend, a record opening for November. The trailer for Star Wars: Episode I - The Phantom Menace was released alongside the film, in its second week.

The film was released in the United Kingdom on April 30, 1999, and topped the country's box office that weekend. As of 2020, The Waterboy is the highest-grossing film in the sports comedy genre.

Accolades

For his role Sandler was nominated for a Golden Raspberry Award for Worst Actor. The Stinkers Bad Movie Awards awarded him Most Annoying Fake Accent in 1998. He also won a Blockbuster Entertainment Award and a MTV Movie Award for his performance. In 2000, the American Film Institute, nominated the film for AFI's 100 Years of Laughs.

Future
In September 2022, Sandler stated that he was open to making a sequel. While the actor stated that he has not figured out the story yet, he was looking forward to returning in the titular role at some point.

References

External links

 
 

1998 comedy films
1998 films
1990s sports comedy films
American football films
American sports comedy films
1990s English-language films
Films about virginity
Films directed by Frank Coraci
Films produced by Adam Sandler
Films produced by Jack Giarraputo
Films set in Louisiana
Films shot in Florida
Pittsburgh Steelers in popular culture
Films with screenplays by Adam Sandler
Films with screenplays by Tim Herlihy
Touchstone Pictures films
Films set in universities and colleges
Films about mother–son relationships
1990s American films